Charlotte Elizabeth Manley  (born 1957) has been Chapter Clerk of St George's Chapel, Windsor since 2003, and was Private Secretary and Treasurer to the Duke of York 2001–2003.

She served in the Royal Navy as an officer 1976–1996.

Manley spent two years as an exchange officer with the United States Navy at Newport, Rhode Island. In 1990 she joined the destroyer HMS Bristol as one of the first women at sea in the Royal Navy.

On 31 December 1993 she was promoted to Commander.

In 1994 she was on the staff of the Second Sea Lord and Commander-in-Chief Naval Home Command.

In 1996 she was on short-term contract in the Cabinet Office, before becoming Assistant Private Secretary and Comptroller to the Duke of York, and Comptroller to Princess Alexandra. Later she was promoted to Deputy Private Secretary and Comptroller to the Duke of York.

On 3 August 2001 she became Private Secretary and Treasurer to the Duke of York.

In 2003 she left the Royal Household and the Office of the Duke of York and became Chapter Clerk of St George's Chapel, Windsor.

Manley was appointed OBE in 1996, LVO in 2003 and CVO in 2018.

References
(2001). "New Private Secretary to the Duke of York" Government News Network. Retrieved 24 September 2007.
Kerr, Jane (2001). "Charlotte is Andy's Top Aide." The Mirror. 13 July.

1957 births
Living people
Commanders of the Royal Victorian Order
Officers of the Order of the British Empire
Private secretaries to Prince Andrew, Duke of York
Royal Navy officers
Women in the Royal Navy
Women's Royal Naval Service officers